Odites is a genus of moths in the family Depressariidae. Most species of this genus are found in Asia and in Africa.

Asian / Palearctic species

Odites actuosa Meyrick, 1914
Odites agraula Meyrick, 1908
Odites albidella (Snellen, 1901)
Odites apicalis Diakonoff, [1968]
Odites approximans Caradja, 1927 
Odites aspasta Meyrick, 1908
Odites atalanta Le Cerf, 1934
Odites atmopa Meyrick, 1914
Odites atonopa Meyrick, 1918
Odites bambusae Walsingham, 1900
Odites brachyclista Meyrick, 1928
Odites centrias (Meyrick, 1894)
Odites choricopa Meyrick, 1931
Odites collega Meyrick, 1927
Odites concava Meyrick, 1922
Odites continua Meyrick, 1935
Odites diacentra Meyrick, 1921
Odites diakonoffi Kuznetsov & Arutjunova, 1991
Odites encarsia Meyrick, 1908
Odites eriopa Meyrick, 1908
Odites euphema Meyrick, 1914
Odites flavimaculata (Christoph, 1882)
Odites fruticosa Meyrick, 1915
Odites furfurosa (Meyrick, 1906)
Odites glaphyra Meyrick, 1908
Odites gomphias Meyrick, 1908
Odites hederae Walsingham, 1900
Odites homocirrha Diakonoff, [1968]
Odites idonea Meyrick, 1925
Odites incallida Meyrick, 1915
Odites incolumis Meyrick, 1918
Odites isocentra (Meyrick, 1906)
Odites issikii (Takahashi, 1961)
Odites kollarella (O. Costa, 1832)
Odites lividula Meyrick, 1932
Odites notocapna Meyrick, 1925
Odites oligectis Meyrick, 1917
Odites orthometra Meyrick, 1908
Odites pancyclia Meyrick, 1928
Odites paracyrta (Meyrick, 1905)
Odites periscias Meyrick, 1928
Odites perissa Diakonoff, [1968]
Odites plocamoca Meyrick, 1935
Odites practoria Meyrick, 1908
Odites praefixa Meyrick, 1921
Odites pragmatias Meyrick, 1914
Odites psilotis (Meyrick, 1905)
Odites pubescentella (Stainton, 1859)
Odites ricinella (Stainton, 1859)
Odites ricini (Stainton, 1859)
Odites scribaria Meyrick, 1915
Odites sphaerophyes Diakonoff, 1966
Odites sphenidias Meyrick, 1914
Odites subsignella (Rebel, 1893)
Odites swinhoei (Butler, 1883)
Odites ternatella (Staudinger, 1859)
Odites velipotens Meyrick, 1935
Odites venusta Moriuti, 1977
Odites xenophaea Meyrick, 1931

African species

Odites aethiopicus Lvovsky, 2001
Odites agathopella Viette, 1968
Odites analogica Meyrick, 1917
Odites anasticta Meyrick, 1930
Odites anisocarpa Meyrick, 1930
Odites arenella Legrand, 1966
Odites argyrophanes (Meyrick, 1937)
Odites armilligera Meyrick, 1922
Odites artigena (Meyrick, 1914)
Odites assidua Meyrick, 1914
Odites atomosperma Meyrick, 1933
Odites balanospila Meyrick, 1930
Odites balsamias Meyrick, 1911
Odites carcharopa Meyrick, 1914
Odites carterella Walsingham, 1891
Odites cataxantha Meyrick, 1915
Odites circiformis Meyrick, 1930
Odites citrantha Meyrick, 1908
Odites citromela Meyrick, 1923
Odites consecrata Meyrick, 1917
Odites consignata Meyrick, 1921
Odites crocota Meyrick, 1912
Odites crossophanta Meyrick, 1930
Odites cuculans Meyrick, 1918
Odites dilutella (Walsingham, 1881)
Odites diopta Meyrick, 1917
Odites duodaca Diakonoff, 1948
Odites emensa Meyrick, 1921
Odites exterrita Meyrick, 1937
Odites fessa Meyrick, 1921
Odites fotsyella Viette, 1973
Odites fructuosa Meyrick, 1915
Odites haplogramma Meyrick, 1930
Odites haplonoma Meyrick, 1915
Odites hemigymna Meyrick, 1930
Odites hemipercna Meyrick, 1914
Odites heptasticta Meyrick, 1914
Odites hermatica Meyrick, 1915
Odites holocitra Meyrick, 1925
Odites holotorna Meyrick, 1925
Odites incolumis Meyrick, 1918
Odites inconspicua Walsingham, 1891
Odites incusata Meyrick, 1921
Odites insons Meyrick, 1912
Odites inversa Meyrick, 1914
Odites johannae Viette, 1987
Odites laconica Meyrick, 1927
Odites lioxesta Meyrick, 1933
Odites malagasiella Viette, 1967
Odites matura Meyrick, 1914
Odites meloxantha Meyrick, 1927
Odites metaclista Meyrick, 1915
Odites metaphracta Meyrick, 1909
Odites metascia Meyrick, 1937
Odites microbolista Meyrick, 1937
Odites minetella Viette, 1985
Odites monogona Meyrick, 1938
Odites natalensis Walsingham, 1891
Odites notosticta Meyrick, 1925
Odites nubeculosa Meyrick, 1918
Odites obumbrata Meyrick, 1925
Odites obvia Meyrick, 1914
Odites ochrodryas Meyrick, 1933
Odites pedicata Meyrick, 1914
Odites pelochrosta Meyrick, 1933
Odites perfusella Viette, 1958
Odites procellosa Meyrick, 1908
Odites prosedra Meyrick, 1915
Odites repetita Meyrick, 1932
Odites semibrunnea Bradley, 1958
Odites semisepta Meyrick, 1930
Odites siccinervis Meyrick, 1930
Odites sucinea Meyrick, 1915
Odites superscripta Meyrick, 1926
Odites thesmia Meyrick, 1917
Odites tinactella Viette, 1958
Odites tsaraella Viette, 1986
Odites typota Meyrick, 1915

Former species
Odites malivora Meyrick, 1930

References

 
Oditinae
Moth genera